A side dish, sometimes referred to as a side order, side item, or simply a side, is a food item that accompanies the entrée or main course at a meal.

Common types

Side dishes such as salad, potatoes and bread are commonly used with main courses throughout many countries of the western world.  Rice and couscous have grown to be quite popular throughout Europe, especially at formal occasions (with couscous appearing more commonly at dinner parties with Middle Eastern dishes).

When used as an adjective qualifying the name of a dish, the term 'side' usually refers to a smaller portion served as a side dish, rather than a larger, main dish-sized serving.  For example, a "side salad" is usually served in a small bowl or salad plate, in contrast to a large dinner-plate-sized entrée salad.

A typical American meal with a meat-based main dish might include one vegetable side dish, sometimes in the form of a salad, and one starch side dish, such as bread, potatoes, rice, pasta, and french fries.

Some common side dishes include:

 Asparagus
 Baked beans
 Baked potatoes
 Broccoli
 Cabbage
 Cauliflower
 Coleslaw
 Dinner rolls or other breads
 French fries or steak fries
 Green beans
 Greens
 Macaroni salad
 Macaroni and cheese
 Mashed potatoes
 Mushrooms
 Pasta salad
 Potato salad
 Salad (often a "side" salad)
 Sautéed mushrooms 
 Squash
 Tater tots

Some restaurants offer a limited selection of side dishes which are included with the price of the entrée as a combination meal.  In contrast, sometimes side dishes are ordered separately from an a la carte menu. The term may or may not imply that the dish can only be ordered with other food. 

French fries are a common side dish served at fast-food restaurants and other American cuisine restaurants. In response to criticism about the high fat and calorie content of French fries, some fast-food chains offer other side dishes, such as salads, as substitutes for the standard French fries with their combination meals.

"On the side"
The related phrase on the side may be synonymous with "side dish" – as in "French fries on the side" – or may refer to a complimentary sauce or condiment served in a separate dish.  For example, a diner may request a salad be served with its dressing "on the side".

See also

 Banchan, Korean side dishes
 In a basket
 Platter (dinner)

References

Further reading

External links

Wikibooks Cookbook

Food and drink terminology
Serving and dining